The following lists events that happened during 1966 in Singapore.

Incumbents
President: Yusof Ishak
Prime Minister: Lee Kuan Yew

Events

February
 17 February – The Internal Security Department and Security and Intelligence Division are formed to maintain national security.

May
5 May – The National Registration Act comes into effect.
9 May – Registration starts for the National Registration Identity Card (NRIC), which comes in laminated plastic.

June
20 June – The first passports are issued.

August
August - The Constitutional Commission Report is issued. Most of the recommendations were not followed except a Council to make sure policies do not discriminate against any racial or religious communities.
3 August – Singapore joins the International Monetary Fund (IMF) and the World Bank. This will enable Singapore to borrow loans for development and share best practices in monetary management.
9 August – The first National Day Parade is held to commemorate Singapore's independence.
12 August – Confrontation ends, after a peace treaty is signed.
22 August – Singapore founds the Asian Development Bank as part of 31 nations. It aims to provide another source of funds for development works.
23 August – The sea curfew is lifted after the end of Confrontation, a decision widely applauded by villagers.
24 August – The National Pledge is recited for the first time, which is written by S. Rajaratnam.
 26 August – A new TV studio is officially opened for Radio and Television Singapore in Caldecott Hill.

December
6 December – Five members from Barisan Sosialis have resigned as Members of Parliament, sparking the 1967 by-elections. They are Tan Cheng Tiong (Jalan Kayu), Poh Ber Liak (Tampines), Ong Lian Teng (Bukit Panjang), Loh Miaw Gong (Havelock) and Koo Young (Thomson).

Births
 8 January – Adrian Pang, Malaysian-born Singaporean actor.
 18 October – Aileen Tan, actress.

Deaths
 31 January – Arthur E. Percival, known for surrendering to the Japanese on 15 February 1942 during World War II (b. 1887).
 2 June – Richard Olaf Winstedt, colonial administrator (b. 1878).
 15 November – Roland St John Braddell, lawyer (b. 1880).

References

 
Singapore
Years in Singapore